Ed (pronounced E-D, abbreviation of "Europa Discount") was a French brand of discount stores founded in 1978. It franchises its name to small-format hard discounts stores in France. It was part of the Carrefour Group.

Key dates
 1978: First store opens in Paris.
 1987–1988: Opening of 100th store. Fresh food and veg first introduced into stores.
 1999–2000: Joins Carrefour Group.
 2012: Take-over by Dia

History
On 3 June 2009, there were 916 Ed stores in France and more than 10,000 employees. The assortment is primarily food stores Ed, fresh produce is placed at the heart of the positioning of the brand.

Ed bought the chain of 'Penny Market' discount stores in May 2005 and 60 stores of the French subsidiary of Edeka (Treff Market in France) in eastern France in 2003.

Re-branding to Dia 
In April 2009, a test of changing some 'Ed' stores to the Dia branding was announced by the Carrefour Group. The shops of Villeneuve-Saint-Georges and Mâcon were some of the first. An insider to the company declared: "The decision to move all of the 918 Ed stores to the Dia banner is already certain. But the timing is not yet decided."

In 2010, 250 stores will be transformed into Dia. It will mark the takeover by the Carrefour group deep discount from its branch in France, to create new synergies with other brands of the group. The Carrefour Discount product range however, should not be sold in Dia stores, which have their own label called "Dia". "But to reduce procurement costs, both private label [products] have the same suppliers," says one expert. "Simply replace the Carrefour packaging with Dia packaging."
Dia stores could also replace some Champion supermarkets located in areas with low purchasing power, rather than the more upmarket Carrefour Market. Conversely, Ed stores in upscale areas like city centres could be transformed into Carrefour City.

References

Supermarkets of France
Retail companies established in 1978
Retail companies disestablished in 2012
No frills